A short bus is U.S. slang for a smaller school bus usually used for transporting special needs students. The term can also refer to:

 Shortbus, an American film
 Short Bus (album), by American band Filter
 Short Bus (EP), by Blink-182 and The Iconoclasts
 Long Beach Shortbus, an American reggae band